Albert Johnson ( – February 17, 1932), also known as the Mad Trapper of Rat River, was a fugitive whose actions stemming from a trapping dispute eventually sparked a huge manhunt in the Northwest Territories and Yukon in Northern Canada. The event became a media circus as Johnson eluded the Royal Canadian Mounted Police (RCMP) team sent to take him into custody, which ended after a  pursuit lasting more than a month and a shootout in which Johnson was fatally wounded on the Eagle River, Yukon. Albert Johnson is suspected to have been a pseudonym and his true identity remains unknown.

Attack on police 
Albert Johnson arrived in Fort McPherson after coming down the Peel River on July 9, 1931. He was questioned by RCMP constable Edgar Millen, but provided little information. Millen thought he had a Scandinavian accent, generally kept himself clean-shaven, and seemed to have plenty of money for supplies. After venturing the waterways in an indigenous-built raft to the Mackenzie River delta, he built a small  cabin on the banks of the Rat River. Johnson had not acquired a trapping license, which was considered odd for someone living in the bush. At that time many northern native traditional trapping areas were being invaded by outsiders fleeing the Great Depression and some complaints may have been intended to remove him.

In December, indigenous trappers complained to the local RCMP detachment in Aklavik that 'Johnson' was tampering with their traps, tripping them and hanging them on the trees. A post incident investigation by the RCMP "found an entirely different story. Evidently, Johnson had roughly told them to take off and had even pointed a gun at them, when they came-a-visiting at Johnson's cabin".

Seeing smoke coming from the chimney, they approached the hut to talk. Johnson refused to talk to them, however, seeming not even to  notice them. King looked into the cabin window, at which point Johnson placed a sack across it. The two constables eventually decided to return to Aklavik and get a search warrant.

King and Bernard returned five days later with two other men. Johnson again refused to talk and eventually King decided to enforce the warrant and force the door. As soon as he began, Johnson shot him through the wooden door. A brief firefight broke out, and the team managed to return the wounded King to Aklavik where he eventually recovered.

Manhunt 
After surrounding the cabin they thawed the dynamite inside their coats. The common version states that this charge was thrown onto the roof of the cabin, collapsing it in the following explosion. After the explosion, the men tried to rush in. Johnson opened fire from a five-foot dugout beneath the ruins. No one was hit, and after a 15-hour standoff (ending at 4:00 A.M.) in the  weather, the posse retreated to Aklavik for further assistance. Again, the RCMP investigative report partially contradicts this, claiming that the dynamite charge barely damaged the cabin, but it was later purposely destroyed to prevent him from returning to it, which may have led to the impression by some that the blast had destroyed it.

By this point, the news had filtered out to the rest of the world via radio. After being delayed because of blizzard conditions, the reinforced posse returned on January 14 to find that Johnson had left the cabin, and the posse struck out after him. Eventually, they caught up with him on January 30, surrounding him in a thicket. In the ensuing firefight, Johnson shot Constable Edgar Millen through the heart, killing him. Millen was later to have a tributary of the Rat River, Millen Creek, named for him. A memorial is located in the area. Once again they fell into retreat. The posse continued to grow, enlisting local Inuvialuit and Gwich'in who were better able to move in the back country. Johnson had clearly decided to leave for the Yukon, but the RCMP blocked the only two passes over the Richardson Mountains. That did not stop Johnson, who climbed a  peak and once again disappeared.

In desperation, the RCMP hired  First World War flying ace and leading post-war aviator Wilfrid "Wop" May of Canadian Airways to help in the hunt by scouting the area from the air. He arrived in the new ski-equipped Bellanca monoplane on February 5. May discovered that Johnson had crossed the Richardson Mountains when the airplane saw his tracks on the far side of the range. On February 14, he discovered the tactics Johnson had been using to elude his followers. He noticed a set of footprints leading off the centre of the frozen surface of the Eagle River to the bank. Johnson had been following the caribou tracks in the middle of the river where they walked in order to give them better visibility of approaching predators. Walking in their tracks had hidden his footprints and allowed him to travel quickly on the compacted snow without having to use his snowshoes. He left the trail only at night to make camp on the river bank, which is the track May had spotted. May radioed back his findings and the RCMP gave chase up the river, eventually being directed to Johnson by February 17.

Death 
The pursuit team rounded a bend in the river to find Johnson only a few hundred yards ahead, standing in front of them. Johnson attempted to run for the bank but was not wearing his snowshoes and could not make it. A firefight broke out in which RCMP Constable Alfred King was seriously wounded and Johnson was killed after being shot in the left side of the pelvis at an acute angle. It is believed that the bullet passed through vital tissues, bowels, and main arteries, which led to his death. May landed the plane, picked up the injured officer and flew him to help for which he was credited with saving his life.

Seventy-five years later in 2007, forensics teams found that his tailbone was not actually symmetrical, causing his spine to curve left and right slightly. In addition, one foot was longer than the other.
 
An examination of Johnson's body yielded over $2,000 in both American and Canadian currency as well as some gold, a pocket compass, a razor, a knife, fish hooks, nails, a dead squirrel, a dead bird, a large quantity of Beecham's Pills and teeth with gold fillings that were believed to be his. During the entire chase, the Mounties had never heard Johnson utter a single word. The only thing they heard was Johnson's laugh after he shot Constable Edgar Millen. To this day people debate who he was, why he moved to the Arctic, or if he was actually responsible for interfering with the trap lines as alleged.

Identity 
The RCMP sent a series of photographs throughout Canada and the United States in an unsuccessful effort to learn his real identity, which has never been definitively established.

In the 1930s, the initial investigation about the identity of Albert Johnson primarily focused on an obscure individual named Arthur Nelson. Details of Nelson's life were recorded by Yukon researcher and author Richard North. Nelson apparently travelled from Dease Lake, British Columbia, up into the Yukon in the 1927 to 1931 period. He had similar guns (a Savage Model 99, a .30-30 Winchester calibre lever action rifle, a sawn-off Iver-Johnson 16 gauge shotgun and a sawn-off Winchester Model 58 .22 Long Rifle) as Albert Johnson. Nelson was also remembered by Kaska Dena elders Art John Sr. and others who knew him by the alias "Mickey Nelson" when he trapped and prospected in the Ross River region in west-central Yukon.

North's 1989 book Trackdown put forward his theory that Albert Johnson, Arthur Nelson, and a North Dakota repeat criminal by the name of John Johnson were one and the same person. John Johnson did time in San Quentin Prison and Folsom Prison, and his physical description is well documented and similar to the Mad Trapper's. North traced John Johnson's identity back to Norway. "Johnny Johnson" was born Johan Konrad Jonsen (1898) in Bardu, Norway north of the Arctic Circle. However, the Mad Trapper's expensive dental work were not likely to belong to the criminal Johnson. Also, DNA tests involving John Johnson's great-nephew Ole Getz disproved that Johnny Johnson and the Mad Trapper were the same people.

The Johnston family of Pictou, Nova Scotia have long believed that Albert Johnson is actually Owen Albert Johnston, a relative who had left Pictou at the beginning of the Great Depression to find work in the United States. The family's last letter from Johnston was posted from Revelstoke, British Columbia early in 1931. They never heard from him again. According to a 2009 radio interview a relative was arranging for DNA tests.

Previous theories were challenged with the release of Mark Fremmerlid's book What Became of Sigvald Anyway. He proposed too many coincidences to ignore the possibility of Sigvald Pedersen Haaskjold from Norway emerging as Albert Johnson. Sigvald was last known as a highly self-sufficient 32-year-old in 1927,  years before the chase and death of Albert Johnson, who was estimated between 35 and 40 years. Sigvald had become obsessed with the notion that the authorities were still looking for him after evading conscription during the First World War. He had built a fortress-like cabin on Digby Island on the north coast of B.C. before disappearing. This author points out circumstantial evidence for this case.

In August 2007, a forensic team assembled by Myth Merchant Films located and exhumed Johnson's grave near the cemetery in Aklavik, then conducted a modern forensic examination on his remains; these were documented in the documentary film The Hunt for the Mad Trapper and the book The Mad Trapper: Unearthing a Mystery by Barbara Smith.

This team found that isotopic analysis of his teeth suggested he may have grown up in Scandinavia or the U.S. Midwest, that he had scoliosis which would have led to chronic back pain, that he was approximately 35 years of age, and that he had been struck multiple times in his final gun battle including his leg, thorax and a debilitating shot from behind through his pelvis. A spiral fracture of his femur supports the anecdote that a bullet had hit and exploded an ammunition pouch on his hip. His dental work was of very high quality for the time suggesting he was able to afford expensive state-of-the-art work at a major centre such as Chicago or New York. DNA samples were also obtained for comparison work.

After the examination his remains were re-interred with full religious rites by both the local priest and native elders, something that had not been afforded to him at his original burial.

While many people had offered convincing circumstantial and anecdotal evidence that they were related to him, the DNA analysis ruled out all of the candidates and his identity remains a mystery.

In 2017, it was decided to attempt a familial DNA investigation; however, technical problems with the DNA eluded analysis until an adequate sequence was developed by Othram Inc. in 2021. Further investigation by Othram traced his ancestors to Sweden, linking him to multiple descendants of Gustaf Magnusson (1776–1853) and Britta Svensdotter (1781–1846), suggesting that he was either their descendant or the descendant of one of their close relatives. Many of his genetic matches traced their ancestry to the Swedish towns of Hånger, Kävsjö and Kulltorp. , further DNA samples and family history were being sought from possible descendants to further the investigation.

Films and music 

 In August 2007, Myth Merchant Films produced a documentary of the exhumation of the 'Mad Trapper's' grave and the subsequent modern forensic examination seeking information about his identity. The documentary was released in 2009. 
The event has been written about in a song called "The Capture of Albert Johnson," by Wilf Carter; as well as by Stanley G. Triggs in the song "The Mad Trapper Of Rat River" on his 1961 album Bunkhouse and Forecastle Songs of the North West (Smithsonian Folkways Recordings).
 The Mad Trapper, a highly fictionalized film based on these events, was released in 1972, and in 1975 Challenge to Be Free was released. An American production, it relocated the events to Alaska and referred to Johnson's character merely as "Trapper", or in the theme song, "Trapper Man". It portrayed Johnson as a man who lived in peace and harmony with wild animals, similar to Johnny Appleseed and whose initial interference with other traps was due to rival trappers' inhumane techniques.
 Another highly fictionalized version of Johnson's story appeared in Charles Bronson's 1981 movie Death Hunt. The film portrays Johnson as a sympathetic character with freedom-loving values and places Edgar Millen (Lee Marvin) in the role of the antagonist making him out to be an alcoholic with few scruples who leads the manhunt to capture Johnson rather than being shot and killed by him. Furthermore, bush pilot Wop May is represented as a Royal Canadian Air Force captain, Hank Tucker, who is shot down and killed by the posse after Tucker wildly shoots up members of the posse.

Books 
 Rudy Wiebe, The Mad Trapper, 1980, Jackpine House Ltd., 186 pages, 
 Thomas York, Trapper, 1981, Avon Books, 476 pages, 
 The Death of Albert Johnson Mad Trapper of Rat River, 1986, Heritage House Publishing Company Ltd., 94 pages, 
 Dick North, The Mad Trapper of Rat River, 2003, The Lyons Press, 338 pages, 
 Hélèna Katz, The Mad Trapper, 2004, Altitude Publishing Canada Ltd., 133 pages, 
 Dick North, The Man Who Didn't Fit In, 2005, The Lyons Press, 259 pages, 
 Barbara Smith, The Mad Trapper: Unearthing a Mystery, 2009, Heritage House Publishing Co., 160 pages, 
 Mark Fremmerlid, What Became of Sigvald Anyway? Was He The Mad Trapper of Rat River? 66 pages, 
 Thomas P. Kelley, Rat River Trapper, 1972, Paper Jacks, 141 pages, 
 Dick North, Trackdown, 1989, Macmillan of Canada, 202 pages,

References

External links 

CBC Program on the Mad Trapper
NorthWest Territories and Yukon Radio System Account of the Pursuit
Wop May's story of the hunt

1932 deaths
1932 murders in Canada
1932 murders in North America
Canadian folklore
Canadian murderers
Fugitives
Fugitives wanted by Canada
History of the Inuvialuit Settlement Region
Persons of National Historic Significance (Canada)
People from the Northwest Territories
People shot dead by law enforcement officers in Canada
Unidentified Canadian criminals
Unidentified decedents
Year of birth uncertain